Valentine's Day: John Zorn's Enigma Trios is an album by John Zorn. In 2014 Zorn took the audio from his existing 2010 album of duos, Enigmata, performed by Marc Ribot & Trevor Dunn on guitar & bass guitar respectively and recorded an improvised drum accompaniment by Tyshawn Sorey to create this album of ex post facto trios. The twelve (instrumental) tracks were given new titles.

Track listing
All compositions by John Zorn
 "Potions and Poisons" – 3:05
 "Fireworks" – 3:38
 "Blind Owl and Buckwheats" – 4:30  
 "Abramelin" – 3:19  
 "Seven Secrets" – 2:53  
 "Before I Saw the Spirit of a Child" – 4:40  
 "UX" – 4:04  
 "The Voynich" – 4:33
 "Codebreaker" – 4:32  
 "Map" – 3:41  
 "Black Mirror" – 2:18  
 "And the Clouds Drift By" – 2:48

Personnel
Trevor Dunn: Electric 5-string Bass 
Marc Ribot: Electric Guitar 
Tyshawn Sorey: Drums

External links
Valentines Day on Tzadik

John Zorn albums
2010 albums